The Royal Dragon Restaurant of Bangkok, Thailand was recorded in the Guinness World Records as the world's largest restaurant in 1992. The  restaurant has seating for 5,000 diners. It was exceeded in capacity by the current record holder, the Bawabet Dimashq (Damascus Gate) Restaurant, which opened in 2002 in Damascus, Syria, with just over 6,000 seats.

Menu
Although the Royal Dragon bills itself as a seafood restaurant, it serves more than 1,000 Thai, Chinese, Japanese, and Western-style dishes.

See also
 List of seafood restaurants
 List of Thai restaurants

References

External links
 Royal Dragon Restaurant

Restaurants in Thailand
Seafood restaurants
Thai restaurants
Guinness World Records